Filip Škvorc (born 22 July 1991 in Hohenems) is a Croatian football striker who plays for NK Bratstvo Savska Ves.

Career
From 2004 to 2010, Škvorc played with the Varteks youth system. He debuted with the club's senior squad in 2010, just after it changed its name to NK Varaždin. The club was financially troubled, having lost its main sponsor (the Varteks clothing factory), and had to miss some salary payments to its players. After successfully having his contract with Varaždin terminated, due to unpaid wages, in June 2011, Škvorc signed a five-year contract with Dinamo Zagreb and was loaned to Lokomotiva. He later had spells in the Austrian third and second tier with SV Allerheiligen and Kapfenberger SV.

References

External links
 

1991 births
Living people
People from Hohenems
Association football forwards
Croatian footballers
Croatia youth international footballers
Croatia under-21 international footballers
NK Varaždin players
NK Lokomotiva Zagreb players
NK Sesvete players
GNK Dinamo Zagreb II players
NK Zavrč players
HNK Gorica players
NK Hrvatski Dragovoljac players
ND Mura 05 players
NK Međimurje players
NK Lučko players
Croatian Football League players
First Football League (Croatia) players
Slovenian PrvaLiga players
Austrian Regionalliga players
2. Liga (Austria) players
Croatian expatriate footballers
Expatriate footballers in Slovenia
Croatian expatriate sportspeople in Slovenia
Expatriate footballers in Austria
Croatian expatriate sportspeople in Austria